Rostaq, also rendered as Rastagh, may refer to:

Rostaq, Afghanistan (village), a village in Takhar Province, Afghanistan
Rustaq District, Afghanistan, a district in Takhar Province, Afghanistan